Katha suffusa is a moth of the family Erebidae first described by John Henry Leech in 1899. It is found in western China.

References

Moths described in 1899
Lithosiina